William Lyburn (born May 8, 1975 in Dumfries, Scotland) is a Scottish-Canadian curler from Winnipeg, Manitoba.

Career
Lyburn won the Scottish junior title with his older brother Allan Lyburn in 1992 and going to the 1992 World Junior Championships where they would finish 6th. He and his family would move to Canada a short time later.

He then went on to assist his brother again, this time when he was the 5th for the Rob Fowler team at the 2012 Tim Hortons Brier where his brother was playing third. Just previously, he won the all-star award for skip at the provincial 2012 Safeway Championship despite failing to win at the event.

Personal life
Lyburn is employed with Master Spas Canada. He is married to Jody Lyburn and has two children.

Grand Slam record

References

External links
 

Scottish male curlers
Living people
1975 births
Sportspeople from Brandon, Manitoba
Curlers from Winnipeg
Sportspeople from Dumfries
Scottish emigrants to Canada